The Orange Bowl International Tennis Championships, known as the Dunlop Orange Bowl International Tennis Championships from 2008 to 2013 with Dunlop as the title sponsor, and renamed the Metropolia Orange Bowl International Tennis Championships from 2013 onwards, is a prestigious junior tennis tournament, one of five that are rated by the ITF as 'Grade A'.  Established in 1947 in Miami Beach, the tournament has for years featured both boys and girls singles and doubles draws at both '18 and under' (under-19) and '16 and under' (under-17) age categories.  From 1999 to 2010, the tournament had been held each December at Crandon Park in Key Biscayne, Florida. Since 2011, it has been held at the Frank Veltri Tennis Center in Plantation, Florida.

History 

The Orange Bowl Tennis Championship began at Flamingo Tennis Center, Miami Beach.  This facility, still in use today, hosted the tournament until 1998, when it was moved to its current site at Crandon Park in Key Biscayne, Florida.  The Orange Bowl was started by Eddie Herr, who wanted to bring some winter competition to South Beach for his tennis playing daughter, Suzanne. The tournament soon grew in prestige and importance, being considered the initiation rite of future world tennis champions. Decades of tournament winners are posted on a brass plaque at the entrance to Flamingo Tennis Center.

Players who have competed at the Orange Bowl reads as a virtual who's who of modern tennis, including Andre Agassi, Arthur Ashe, Boris Becker, Björn Borg, Jimmy Connors, Jim Courier, Stefan Edberg, Chris Evert, Roger Federer, Steffi Graf, Justine Henin, Ivan Lendl, Hana Mandlíková, Andy Roddick, Gabriela Sabatini, Monica Seles, Guillermo Vilas, and Mats Wilander.  As of 2017, Miami's Mary Joe Fernandez is the only player, male or female, to win in every age division of the Orange Bowl and Junior Orange Bowl tournaments: 12s, 14s, 16s, and 18s.  However, Miami's Lynn Epstein, won the 12s, 14s and skipped the 16s to play up winning the 18s two years in a row. Epstein is the only player, to this day, to have achieved this feat.

In 1983, during the tournament's heyday, a professional stadium was built in Flamingo Park. The Abel Holtz stadium seated 9,000 fans. During the 1990s however, Flamingo Park Tennis Center fell victim to poor maintenance. The standards of the Orange Bowl could not be maintained so in 1999 the tournament was moved to the Tennis Center at Crandon Park in Key Biscayne, home of today's professional tour event, the Miami Open (tennis). The City of Plantation has restored the Orange Bowl Tournament's allure and luster, hosting the best administered and best managed tournament in decades.  .

Recently, there has been a tennis revival in Miami Beach.  A $5.5M master plan to renovate the Flamingo tennis facility has begun. The project includes a new  tennis building and 17 clay hydro-courts. A large bronze plaque containing the names of all the great tennis champions who began their career playing in the tournament in Flamingo park will be restored, along with a plaque honoring local players who went on to tennis fame, such as Jerry Moss.

Since 1962, the two younger age groups ('12 and under' and '14 and under') are held at a separate site in Coral Gables. Hence today, the Junior Orange Bowl is in Coral Gables. And the Orange Bowl (under 16 and under 18) has moved in 2011 from Miami to Plantation, FL thus changing surfaces from Hard Courts to Clay, the first time since 1998 that the tournament will be on clay.

Dunlop has been the tournament's title sponsor since 2008. From 2013 onwards, Metropolia International Holdings became the title sponsor of the tournament.

Tournament features
Players must be at least 13 years old to compete, unless competing in the 12 and unders.

Past champions

Singles champions

Doubles champions

See also
 Junior Orange Bowl (tennis)

References

External links
 
 1930 Master Plan Flamingo Park
 Orange Bowl International Tennis Championship at usta.com

Junior tennis
Recurring sporting events established in 1947
Oran
1947 establishments in Florida
Sports in Miami-Dade County, Florida
Plantation, Florida
Clay court tennis tournaments